Theodore Sutton Parvin was born on the 15th of January, 1817, in Cumberland County, New Jersey. In 1833 he graduated at Woodworth College, Ohio, and began the study of law, graduating at the Cincinnati Law School in 1837. In 1838 Robert Lucas, who had been appointed Governor of the new Territory of Iowa, selected Mr. Parvin for his private secretary. He accompanied the Governor to Burlington where he was appointed to take charge of the Territorial library. In 1839 Mr. Parvin was appointed District Attorney of the middle District and removed to Bloomington. He served three terms as probate judge. In 1844 he rendered Iowa an enduring service by cooperating with Enoch W. Eastman and Frederick D. Mills in defeating the Constitution which proposed to deprive the State of the counties of the Missouri slope. Upon the organization of the United States District Court in 1846 Mr. Parvin was appointed clerk, a position he held ten years. In 1857 he was nominated for Register of the State Land Office by the Democrats and, notwithstanding the Republican majority of more than 2,000 in the election for Governor the same year, Mr. Parvin was elected. He was one of the first trustees of the State University and was for ten years professor of natural science in that institution.

He was one of the organizers of the State Historical Society and served several years as its secretary and as editor of the Annals of Iowa, an historical magazine published by the society. Mr. Parvin made large contributions to the library, newspaper files and general collections of that Society, and for more than thirty years was one of the most valued writers of historical and biographical articles for the Annals of Iowa and the Historical Record. Having been one of the first officials of the Territory and long associated with its public affairs, personally acquainted with prominent men of all parties for more than sixty years, Mr. Parvin was long regarded the highest authority on Iowa history and biography.

He was one of the founders of the Masonic Order of Iowa and has been Grand Master and Grand Secretary of the Grand Lodge of the State many years. In his capacity as secretary he collected at their building at Cedar Rapids the most extensive Masonic library in the world. He also collected and donated to the library a more complete collection of Iowa books and rare documents than is possessed by any other library. Mr. Parvin's contributions of early Iowa newspapers, legislative journals and session laws, long out of print and other rare publications to the State and Historical libraries have been continuous and exceedingly valuable. He was one of the most valued members of the Pioneer Lawmakers' Association and his historical contributions to that organization have been of great value. His writings and addresses on historical subjects relating to Iowa for half a century would fill several volumes. He died at his home at Cedar Rapids, June 28, 1901.

Parvin served as a schoolteacher in Cincinnati schools for a number of years; among his pupils there was the painter George Henry Yewell, later to become prominent in Iowa affairs himself.

References

1817 births
1901 deaths
People from Cumberland County, New Jersey
People from Cedar Rapids, Iowa
University of Cincinnati College of Law alumni
Iowa Democrats
University of Iowa faculty
Iowa lawyers
19th-century American lawyers
American male non-fiction writers
19th-century American historians
Historians of Iowa
19th-century American male writers
Historians from Iowa
Historians from New Jersey